The 1925 Workers' Summer Olympiad was the second edition of International Workers' Olympiads. The games were held from July 24 to July 28 at Frankfurt am Main in Germany.

Total number of participants was more than 100,000 of which 3,000 were actual athletes from 12 countries. The rest were spectators who were invited to take part on mass gymnastics that underlined the ideas of worker sports. Motto of the 1925 Olympiad was "Nie wieder Krieg!" – No More War!

The events mostly took place at the newly opened Waldstadion that is today known as Commerzbank-Arena. An outdoor swimming pool, Stadionbad, was built for the swimming competitions. The opening ceremony had a choir of 1,200 people singing and later 60,000 actors took part in the drama presentation "Worker Struggle for the Earth" marching through the streets of Frankfurt. All events attracted a total of 450,000 spectators.

The most notable result was a new world record of 51.3 in women's 4×100 metres relay set by the German team of Arbeiter-Turn- und Sportbund (ATSB), although it was never ratified by IAAF. Football tournament was also won by the German team of ATSB. The most successful athletes came from Finnish Workers' Sports Federation, winning 31 events out of 44.

Sports 
 Athletics
 Boxing
 Cycling
 Football
 Gymnastics
 Swimming
 Water polo
 Wrestling

Participating countries

Men's results

Athletics 
Source:

Boxing 
Source:

Cycling

Gymnastics 
Source:

Swimming 
Source:

Water polo 
Source:

Wrestling (Greco-Roman) 
Source:

Women's results

Athletics 
Source:

[a] Germany (2:14.6) disqualified

Gymnastics 
Source:

Swimming 
Source:

[a] Irma Lumivuokko, FIN (1:35.4) disqualified
[b] Germany (4:51.4) disqualified

References 

International Workers' Olympiads
Workers' Summer Olympiad
International sports competitions hosted by Germany
Sports competitions in Frankfurt
Workers' Summer Olympiad
Multi-sport events in Germany
Workers' Summer Olympiad
20th century in Frankfurt
Workers' Summer Olympiad
1920s in Prussia